The name Debbie has been used for four tropical cyclones in the Atlantic Ocean and for two in the Australian region.

In the Atlantic:
 Tropical Storm Debbie (1957), struck the Florida panhandle
 Hurricane Debbie (1961), Category 1 hurricane that hit Ireland as an extratropical storm
 Tropical Storm Debbie (1965), crossed the northeastern Yucatán Peninsula as a depression and dissipated offshore from Mississippi
 Hurricane Debbie (1969), Category 3 major hurricane that brushing Newfoundland

In the Australian region:
 Cyclone Debbie (2003), Category 3 severe tropical cyclone that made landfall in the Northern Territory
 Cyclone Debbie (2017), Category 4 severe tropical cyclone that made landfall in Queensland

Atlantic hurricane set index articles
Australian region cyclone set index articles